Rancocas is an unincorporated community located within Westampton Township in Burlington County, New Jersey. The name derives from the Native American word Rankokous. which was used in the name of the Powhatan Lenape Nation Indian Reservation located in Westampton Township. The name was also known as a sub-tribe of the Ancocus. The Reservation was a popular tourist destination for visitors from the Philadelphia area, New York, and local residents, before the Reservation became Rancocas State Park.

History
The village developed along the Mount Holly–Beverly Turnpike. In 1703, a Quaker meeting house, a log building, was erected in the community.

Historic district

The Rancocas Historic Village, also known as the Rancocas Village Historic District, is a historic district in Rancocas Village, bounded north and west by the Willingboro Township border, east to Springside Road and south to 3rd Street. It was added to the National Register of Historic Places on June 5, 1975 for its significance in architecture, commerce, and education. The district includes 46 contributing buildings. The Quaker meeting house, a Friends meeting house, on Main Street was built in 1772 and features Flemish bond and patterned brick work. The nearby Friends school was built in 1822, also with brick.

Gallery

See also
Rancocas Creek
Rancocas Woods, New Jersey
Timbuctoo, New Jersey
List of the oldest buildings in New Jersey
List of Quaker meeting houses

References

External links

Rancocas Official Website
Rankokous Indian Reservation
 
 

Westampton Township, New Jersey
Unincorporated communities in Burlington County, New Jersey
Unincorporated communities in New Jersey
National Register of Historic Places in Burlington County, New Jersey
Historic districts on the National Register of Historic Places in New Jersey
New Jersey Register of Historic Places